Frank Ramsay McNinch (April 27, 1873 – April 2, 1950) was born in Charlotte, North Carolina. He was a political figure who served as the mayor of Charlotte, as chairman of the Federal Power Commission, and as chairman of the Federal Communications Commission. In the 1928 presidential election, McNinch, a Democrat, supported Republican Herbert Hoover for president. After he was elected, Hoover appointed McNinch to a seat on the Federal Power Commission, leading to a split in the North Carolina Democratic Party that damaged the political fortunes of new U.S. Sen. Cameron Morrison, a friend of McNinch. He was later appointed FPC chairman by Franklin D. Roosevelt.

The controversial 1938 Orson Welles War of the Worlds radio broadcast occurred during his tenure as FCC head.  McNinch resigned as FCC chairman on July 25, 1939, due to ill health.

His home, the Frank Ramsay McNinch House, was listed on the National Register of Historic Places in 1999.

References

Further reading

External links
Charlotte-Mecklenburg website biography 
Time magazine
Chairmen of the FPC and FERC 
Radio's War of the Worlds Broadcast
Frank McNinch Papers: J. Murrey Atkins Library, UNC Charlotte

1873 births
1950 deaths
Chairmen of the Federal Communications Commission
Federal Power Commission
Mayors of Charlotte, North Carolina
North Carolina Democrats
Franklin D. Roosevelt administration personnel
Hoover administration personnel